Grimes School is a historic school building located at Lexington, Davidson County, North Carolina. It was built in 1935–1936, and is a two-story, "T"-shaped, Colonial Revival style brick building.  It features large windows, an entrance portico with Ionic order fluted columns, and a large octagonal cupola. Some funding for school construction was provided by the Public Works Administration.

It was added to the National Register of Historic Places in 1988.

References

See also
 National Register of Historic Places listings in Davidson County, North Carolina

Public Works Administration in North Carolina
School buildings on the National Register of Historic Places in North Carolina
Colonial Revival architecture in North Carolina
School buildings completed in 1936
Buildings and structures in Davidson County, North Carolina
National Register of Historic Places in Davidson County, North Carolina